Engaged to Death (Italian: I fidanzati della morte) is a 1957 Italian sports drama film directed by Romolo Marcellini and starring Rik Battaglia, Sylva Koscina and Margit Nünke. The veteran German star Hans Albers appears in a supporting role. The film portrays the lives of top motorcycle racing competitors.

The film's sets were designed by the art director Carlo Egidi. It was shot in Eastmancolor.

Cast
 Rik Battaglia as Carlo 
 Sylva Koscina as Lucia 
 Margit Nünke as Giovanna 
 Gustavo Rojo as Pietro 
 Hans Albers as Lorenzo 
 Carlo Ninchi as Parisi 
 Saro Urzì as Tulio 
 Anna Maini
 Marida Vanni
 Giovanni Piva
 Marco Guglielmi
 Edoardo Toniolo
 Piero Pastore
 Giorgio Pucci
 Valeria Fabrizi
 Renato Navarrini
 Spartaco Ricci
 Geoffrey Duke as Biker 
 Libero Liberati as Biker 
 Bill Lomas as Biker 
 Enrico Lorenzetti as Biker 
 Pierre Monneret as Biker 
 Alessandro Tedeschi as Tour Eiffel Tourist 
 Maria Tedeschi as Tour Eiffel Tourist

References

Bibliography
 Gianni Rondolino. Dizionario del cinema italiano 1945-1969. G. Einaudi, 1969.

External links

1957 films
Italian auto racing films
1950s Italian-language films
Films directed by Romolo Marcellini
1950s sports drama films
Italian sports drama films
Motorcycle racing films
Films scored by Angelo Francesco Lavagnino
1957 drama films
1950s Italian films